Mitchell Park Horticultural Conservatory (Mitchell Park Domes or The Domes) is a conservatory located at Mitchell Park in Milwaukee, Wisconsin, United States. It is owned and operated by the Milwaukee County Park System, and replaced the original Milwaukee Conservatory which stood from 1898 to 1955. The three domes display a large variety of plant life.

Description 

They are properly referred to as the world's first conoidal domes. They cover  of display area and were constructed in stages from 1959 to 1967.

Connecting the three domes is a central lobby area, which was extensively redesigned in the summer of 2008. A smaller service dome behind the Conservatory holds replacement plants and an orchid collection. This section is not open to the public.

Deterioration of the Domes
The Conservatory was closed during the summer of 2008 to facilitate the replacement of 800 cracked glass panels.  The lobby was remodeled and a $500,000 donation allowed for a new external and internal lighting system.  The Conservatory re-opened to large crowds on October 20, 2008.  A series of concerts was held on Thursday nights through November. Several other improvements include a re-configured parking lot, outside landscaping and a new educational center.

Beginning February 8, 2016, the Mitchell Park Domes were closed because of structural concerns. By the end of 2016, repairs allowed all three domes to be reopened to the public.

In 2017, a greenhouse complex at the rear of the Conservatory was opened to replace previous off-site facilities.

In 2019, after years of deterioration and falling concrete debris, Gallagher Museum Services was hired to do a study of the three domes. That firm recommended demolition of the domes, at an estimated cost of 300 million dollars. This recommendation has been rebuked by the National Trust for Historic Preservation and Milwaukee County Supervisor Jason Haas said it has no impact on the future of the domes.

Domes 

Each of the three domes maintains a distinct climate and setting for the exposition of its contents.

Show Dome 
The Show Dome opened in December 1964. It hosts four seasonal shows and one holiday exhibit held annually in December for visitors to enjoy. Each show has a theme chosen based on cultural (such as Japanese, German and French), literary (Charles Dickens "A Christmas Carol"), or historical interest (Colonial Williamsburg and the History of Herb Gardening, for example).
In most recent years, the Winter Show
has featured an extensive garden railway display put on with the cooperation of many Wisconsin Model Railroad club members. The garden railway has become one of the most popular displays during the year and is one of the largest such indoor displays in the Midwest.

Tropical Dome 
The Tropical Dome opened in February 1966. The Tropical Dome features nearly 1,000 species of plants, including many nutritionally important fruit bearing plants such as banana, papaya, ackee, guava, avocado, and cacao. One of the cacao trees is over 60 years old and was transplanted from the old Conservatory. It still sets fruit each year.  Hardwoods include big-leaf, little-leaf, and African mahoganies, ebony and lignum vitae. A rare curare vine can also be found growing.

The dome is seasonally decorated with a wide variety of blooming plants, including a number of award-winning orchids. The center of the Dome is dominated by a large kapok tree. It is one of the tallest trees under glass. At one time, its height  was up to 95 feet (29 m) high, but is now kept at a more manageable 60 feet (18 m). In addition to the plants, the Tropical Dome is home to a number of colorful birds.

Arid Dome 
The Arid Dome opened in November 1967. It displays a wide variety of plants from the Americas and Africa. The American section contains a large number of plants native to the Sonoran Desert, including shrubs, trees, annuals and bulbs, as well as the familiar cacti. The African section has aloes, crassulas, euphorbias, along with the unusual Welwitschia plant, which has only two continuously growing leaves and may live for over a thousand years.

Another section hosts the succulent flora of Madagascar and includes plants such as Euphorbia, Pachypodium, Adenia, Didierea, Alluaudia, and Operculicarya. Many of them were grown from seed obtained in Madagascar. This area was formally dedicated on September 8, 1984 by Leon Rajaobelina, the Ambassador from Madagascar.

In August 2006, an Encephalartos ferox produced a double red-colored cone.  It is only the second time in over 30 years this has happened.  The cones are expected to last several months, most likely until spring brings warmer weather.

Mitchell Park 
Mitchell Park is one of the six original Milwaukee parks created by the first park commission. It occupies a spot on the south side of Milwaukee, starting with a core of  that was donated by John L. Mitchell, father of General Billy Mitchell and named for the donor.

Also found on park grounds, at a bluff overlooking the Menomonee Valley, is a monument marking the site of an early trading post built by Jacques Vieau. Vieau was a settler and fur trader who later became father-in-law to Milwaukee founder Solomon Juneau. Just south of the Conservatory was the site of extensive formal gardens and a sunken water feature.  Opened in 1904, it was removed in the late 1980s due to budget cuts.

Photo Gallery

See also 

 List of botanical gardens and arboretums in Wisconsin

References

External links 
Milwaukee County Park System
Friends of the Domes

Buildings and structures in Milwaukee
Culture of Milwaukee
Historic American Landscapes Survey in Wisconsin
Landmarks in Wisconsin
Botanical gardens in Wisconsin
Parks in Milwaukee, Wisconsin
Protected areas of Milwaukee County, Wisconsin
Tourist attractions in Milwaukee
Articles containing video clips
Greenhouses in Wisconsin
1959 establishments in Wisconsin
Works Progress Administration in Wisconsin